Hogan Hall is a dormitory of Columbia University primarily reserved for fourth-year undergraduate students. The dorm is popular for its suite configurations as well as its central location. Built in 1898 as a nursing home, the building was converted to graduate student housing in 1977. It was named after Frank S. Hogan. It was converted into an undergraduate residence in 1994, then renovated in 2000 with the completion of a new entrance connecting it to Broadway Hall, designed by Robert A.M. Stern Architects. Located at the corner of 114th Street and Broadway in the Manhattan neighborhood of Morningside Heights, the building is named for former New York District Attorney Frank Hogan.

Notable residents 

 Cristina Teuscher, Olympic swimmer and gold medalist
 Jonah Reider, known for opening the four-seat supper club Pith in his dorm room

References

External links

Hogan Hall at Columbia Housing
"Housing the Columbia Community", lecture by Professor Andrew S. Dolkart on October 5, 1999
"Home on the Heights: 100 Years of Housing at Columbia" by Michael Foss, Columbia College Today, September 2005

Columbia University dormitories
University and college dormitories in the United States